Michael Patrick Thornton is an American actor and theater director. He recently played the character of Dr. Gabriel Fife in the ABC drama series Private Practice. He's also known for his performances on Broadway including as Lennox in the Sam Gold revival of Macbeth (2022), and Dr. Rank in the Jamie Lloyd revival of A Doll's House (2023).

Early life and education
Thornton is a native of Jefferson Park, a neighborhood on Chicago's northwest side. He is a graduate of The School at Steppenwolf, The Second City Conservatory, and The Second City Directing Program.

Career 

Thornton is artistic director and co-founder of The Gift Theatre. He has acted in productions including Richard III at Steppenwolf, where he became the first actor to act onstage while wearing a robotic exoskeleton. He has also portrayed Iago in Othello at The Gift Theatre and in Actors Theatre of Louisville’s 50th anniversary production of Our Town. Thornton received a Jeff Nomination for his performance in The Gift's premiere of ensemble member Andrew Hinderaker's Suicide, Incorporated.

Thornton also directs at The Gift, including the world premiere of David Rabe's Good For Otto, War of the Worlds, the Chicago Premiere of Will Eno's Oh, The Humanity (and other exclamations). As a writer, his plays have been workshopped in New York through Young Playwrights, Inc. and in Chicago through Second City. He is the theater's artistic director.

Thornton has appeared in episodes of television's Elementary (CBS) The Exorcist (FOX), Private Practice, The Chicago Code, Ron Howard's The Dilemma, and the independent feature film The View From Tall.

Selected filmography

Feature films

Television

Theater

References

External links
 

American male television actors
American theatre directors
Year of birth missing (living people)
Living people